HD 75710 is a single star in the constellation of Vela. It has an apparent visual magnitude of approximately 4.94, which is bright enough to be faintly visible to the naked eye.

The stellar classification of this star is A2 III, suggesting it is in the giant star stage of its stellar evolution. It has a high rate of spin with a projected rotational velocity of 110 km/s, which is giving the star an oblate shape with an equatorial bulge that is 7% larger than the polar radius.

References

A-type giants
Vela (constellation)
Velorum, g
CD-44 04861
075710
043347
3520